The Torneo Gran Alternativa (Spanish for "the Great Alternative Tournament") is an annual lucha libre (professional wrestling) tournament held by the Mexican professional wrestling promotion Consejo Mundial de Lucha Libre (CMLL). The tournament was not held in 1997, 2000, or 2002, but was held twice in 1996 and 1998. The most recent Torneo Gran Alternativa tournament was held in December 2021. The tournament has always been held in Arena Mexico in Mexico City, Mexico, the main arena of CMLL.

Up until 2010 the tournament format was that of eight tag teams facing off in a one night, single elimination tournament, sometimes with a match to determine the seeds for the tournament. In 2010 the field of competitors was doubled to 16 and the tournament would take place over three shows, with eight teams facing off in Block A, the other eight in Block B and the two block winners would wrestle the following week. All tournament matches except the finals are single fall matches, while the finals are a best two-out-of-three falls per lucha libre traditions.

The concept of the tournament is to team a young up-and-comer with a veteran and use the tournament to help showcase the younger talent, the young winner is often someone CMLL has plans for, although at times it has not always had the desired result.

Último Guerrero and Carístico are the only wrestlers to have won the tournament three times. Último Guerrero won in 1999 as the rookie and in 2008 and 2011 as the veteran of the team. Carístico, then known as "Místico" won in his rookie year in 2004 and then as a veteran in 2007 and again in 2017. Héctor Garza and Rey Escorpión have both won the tournament twice, once as a rookie and once as the "veteran" and Emilio Charles Jr. has won it twice as a veteran. Complete results have not been found documented for the 1998 event, but based on known information at least 187 individual wrestlers have participated in 22 tournaments as of 2017. Atlantis is both the wrestler and the veteran with most tournament appearances, 15, and has always been on the veteran side of the teams. Último Guerrero is second with 13 tournament appearances. Astro Rey Jr. and Sangre Azteca has worked the most tournaments on the novato side, five in total and none as a veteran.

Tournament winners

Tournament history

Starting in 1994 the Mexican professional wrestling promotion Consejo Mundial de Lucha Libre (CMLL) created a special tournament concept where they would team up a novato, or rookie, with a veteran for a single-elimination tag team tournament. The tournament was called El Torneo Gran Alternativa, or "The Great Alternative Tournament" and became a recurring event on the CMLL calendar. In 1996 and 1999 CMLL held two tournaments, but since then has held one a year at most. CMLL did not hold a Gran Alternativa tournament in 1997 and 2000 held on each year from 2001 through 2014, opting not to hold a tournament in 2015. The 2017 Torneo Gran Alternativa was the 22nd version of the tournament.

CMLL holds other similar tournaments focusing on younger wrestlers, such as La Copa Junior, En Busca de un Ídolo ("In Search of an Idol"), Torneo Sangre Nueva ("New Blood Tournament"), and Forjando un Ídolo ("Forging an Idol"), although all of those tournaments focuses on singles competition. The "Novato/Veteran" team competition has been adopted by other Mexican wrestling companies, including International Wrestling Revolution Group (IWRG) who held the Proyeccion a Nuevas Promesas tournament in 2010 and 2011, and from 2012, on has held a novato/veteran tag team tournament in January each year under the name El Protector.

As of the 2017 tournament, 187 wrestlers competed in one or more of the tournaments held, with Atlantis holding tor record for most tournaments, a total of 15. He is also the wrestler to have worked most tournament as a veteran as all his appearances were on the veteran side. Sangre Azteca and Astro Rey Jr. (now known as Mephisto) are tied for most tournaments as a novato, with five each. Raziel is the novato that has gone the longest between his first and most recent appearance as a novato, seven years between the 2010 tournament and the 2017 tournament. Último Guerrero and Místico/Carístic are the only wrestlers to win the tournament three times, once as a novato and twice as a veteran each. Héctor Garza and Rey Escorpión are the only other wrestlers to have won the tournament as both a novato and a veteran. Silver King has appeared under three different ring names, Silver King, Bronco and Black Tiger. Several others have worked different tournaments under different names/masks, usually without CMLL officially acknowledging the connection; El Sagrado as both Genetico and Sagrado, Fuego as Flash and Fuego, Máscara Dorada as Metalik and Máscara Dorada, Tritón as Metal Blanco and Tritón, Ramstein as Fugaz and Ramstein, Titán as Palacio Negro and Titán.

References